The Flexenbahn is an aerial cableway (cable car) in Stuben am Arlberg in the Austrian province of Vorarlberg. The valley station is located in the area of Alpe Rauz.

History
The Flexenbahn is part of the Ski Arlberg ski area and borders both of the Austrian provinces of Vorarlberg and Tyrol. The Flexenbahn is the key link with which the largest contiguous ski resort in Austria could be realized.

References

External links 

 Official website of the Flexenbahn
 Website of Ski Arlberg

Aerial tramways
Transport in Vorarlberg